Qusheh Tappeh (also Romanized as Qūsheh Tappeh; also known as Qūsh Tappeh) is a village in Maraveh Tappeh Rural District, in the Central District of Maraveh Tappeh County, Golestan Province, Iran. At the 2006 census, its population was 258, in 51 families.

References 

Populated places in Maraveh Tappeh County